Keith Wylie was an Australian rugby league footballer who played for South Sydney of the New South Wales Rugby League Premiership. He played three seasons with the team, playing as a wing.

Playing career 
Wylie played his first career game in round 11 of the 1934 season vs University. He scored two tries on debut to help his team win 30-5.He played in South Sydney's 6-19 loss to Eastern Suburbs in the Semi Finals.

In 1935, Wylie scored two tries in a round 14 win over Balmain. The following round, he scored three tries agwainst Newtown, helping his side win 21-13. South Sydney advanced to the grand final, though Wylie missed the game due to a nagging elbow injury.

Wylie played his final game in round 6 of the 1936 season against North Sydney. He concluded his career with 7 tries in 15 appearances.

References 

Australian rugby league players
South Sydney Rabbitohs players